Cardboard Heroes is a line of miniatures published in 1980 by Steve Jackson Games.  An extension, Cardboard Heroes Champions Set 3: Enemies, was published in 1984.

Contents
Denis Loubet designed a set of miniatures called Cardboard Heroes (1980), a set of 40 full-color 25mm cardboard figures for use in fantasy roleplaying games, published by Steve Jackson Games (SJG).

Cardboard Heroes Champions Set 3: Enemies includes cardboard miniatures for 36 villains taken from Enemies I and Enemies II, adventure scenarios published in Space Gamer and Champions adventures published by Hero Games, and from the front of the Champions box.

Reception
Martin Feldman reviewed Cardboard Heroes in The Space Gamer No. 38. Feldman commented that "they are beautiful, they are inexpensive, and if you like them and have no objection to cardboard, they are certainly worthwhile."

Craig Sheeley reviewed Cardboard Heroes Champions Set 3: Enemies in The Space Gamer No. 73. Sheeley commented that "Enemies is a great set. Champions, being a movement game, needs representative counters for the heroes and villains, and the three dozen in the first Cardboard Heroes pack weren't enough. If you play Champions, or any superhero game using markers, this set is a must."

Reviews
Different Worlds #22 (July, 1982)

See also
List of lines of miniatures

References

External links
 Richard Day, Bruce Cassick (eds), "Steve Jackson Games", The Armory's Buyers Guide To Fantasy Miniatures, vol. 1, iss. 1, Roy Lipman, Summer 1983.  Includes illustrations of figures.

Champions (role-playing game)
Miniature figures